Bracquemont is a former commune in the Seine-Maritime department in the Normandy region in northern France. On 1 January 2016, it was merged into the new commune of Petit-Caux.

Geography
Huge cliffs, overlooking the English Channel, form the commune's northern border

Heraldry

Population

Places of interest
 The church of Notre-Dame, dating from the seventeenth century.
 A pre-Roman archaeology site – the “Cité des Limes”.

See also
Communes of the Seine-Maritime department

References

Former communes of Seine-Maritime
Caletes